X-55 is the Lockheed Martin X-55 aircraft.

X55, X.55, X-55, or variation may also refer to:

Vehicles

Aviation
 Kh-55 (also called "X-55"), Soviet air-launched cruise missile
 X-55 (UAV), an Armenian armed forces aerial drone

Automotive
 Senova X55, former name of the Beijing X5 compact crossover SUV  
 MVM X55, a variant of the compact crossover SUV Chery Tiggo 5x

Other
 SJ X55 Regina, a Swedish electric multiple unit train model
 X55, an X-Yachts sailing yacht

Other uses
 Mid-Florida Airport (FAA id X55), Eustis, Florida, US; see List of airports in Florida
 Snapdragon X55 chipset; see List of Qualcomm Snapdragon modems
 Eika X55 synthesizer, a clonewheel organ
 X55, a copper-zinc brazing alloy

See also

 U (Unicode entity U+0055, &#x55;) 
 
 
 X5 (disambiguation)
 55 (disambiguation)
 X (disambiguation)